The 1945–46 Cypriot First Division was the 9th season of the Cypriot top-level football league.

Overview
It was contested by 6 teams, and EPA Larnaca FC won the championship.

League standings

Results

References
Cyprus - List of final tables (RSSSF)

Cypriot First Division seasons
Cyp
1